The Sydney Figure Skating Club  was founded in 1961 and is the oldest continually existing figure skating club in Australia and the Southern Hemisphere.

See also

References

External links

Figure skating clubs
Sporting clubs in Sydney
1961 establishments in Australia
Sports clubs established in 1961
Figure skating in Australia